Rosemont Historic District may refer to:
Rosemont Historic District (Alexandria, Virginia)
Rosemont Historic District (Martinsburg, West Virginia)

See also
Rosemont Crest Historic District, a National Register of Historic Places listing in Dallas County, Texas